Pleasant Gardens was the plantation in Rowan County, North Carolina, occupied by Joseph "Pleasant Gardens" McDowell (17581799).  Remains of the Pleasant Gardens house are located near Marion, North Carolina.

History
The land for the Pleasant Gardens estate was purchased by Hunting John McDowell, Joseph McDowell's father, in 1768.  The land was originally located in Anson County until 1753, when it became Rowan County and became part of Burke County in 1777.  Joseph McDowell was born on February 25, 1758, before his father purchased the Pleasant Gardens estate.  In 1842, the land became part of McDowell County, named for Joseph "Pleasant Gardens" McDowell, who died on May 18, 1795.   

Recent historical analysis and research on the remaining property indicates that the Pleasant Gardens plantation house was built between 1812 and 1826 by Joseph McDowell's third son James Moffett McDowell (1791-1854).  The plantation remained in this McDowell family until 1848.   The plantation, currently located on U.S. 70, northwest of Marion, North Carolina, fell into disrepair in the 20th century.

In the 1790 Census in Burke County, North Carolina, Joseph McDowell, Jr. is listed as head of household with two white males under the age of 16, one female, and nine slaves.

After Joseph McDowell's death, his wife, Mary Moffett McDowell, married John Carson.   Mary inherited part of the Pleasant Gardens estate on which John Carson built Carson House.

Additional history
The following account is given in the McDowell County article, but it is unreferenced.

In 1748, "Hunting" John McDowell received a land grant for property known today as Pleasant Gardens, including acreage originally located from Swan's Pond (Catawba County) up the Catawba River west to present-day Marion and into the region known as Buck Creek.  During a hunting expedition with his friend Henry Weidner, the two came upon a lush, green valley with thousands upon thousands of acres of virgin forest.  During that time, a custom when settling a dispute was to engage in a "friendly" wrestling match.  McDowell came out the winner.

After establishing residence along the Catawba River area of Pleasant Gardens, McDowell raised his family, and subsequently received two land grants.  He is noted in Max Dixon's book The Wataugans as being instrumental in Jacob Brown's Purchase of one of the last remaining pieces of acreage along the Nolichucky River in Tennessee when he hosted a negotiations with the Cherokee on his farm in North Carolina.

His son, Joseph McDowell, is noted in history as a significant contributor to the Battle at Kings Mountain.  McDowell County is named in his honor.  Today, his home stands as one of the few remaining homes in North Carolina still standing and built by its namesake.

References

External links

  
  
 Brochure from McDowell House restaurant (marker file, Research Branch, North Carolina Office of Archives and History)
 
  
 Land Grant, Joseph McDowell, Anson County, North Carolina, 31 Mar 1750, Book: 10 pg: 286; Catawba River
 Land Grant, Joseph McDowell, Anson County, Granted 1750, Book 375, On the No. side of Catawba River joining the lands he now lives on beginning at a red oak on both sides of the Great Meadow, no 610

Plantation houses in North Carolina
Buildings and structures in McDowell County, North Carolina
Tourist attractions in McDowell County, North Carolina